William H. West (June 18, 1853 – February 15, 1902) was an American blackface performer, known as the "Progressive Minstrel". He was one of the first white owners of a minstrel troupe composed of black performers in the United States.

Biography
He was born on June 18, 1853, in Syracuse, New York.

He often produced and played minstrel shows with George Primrose, first with a minstrel troupe owned by J. H. Haverly, and later in a show known as Primrose and West starring entertainers Milt G. Barlow and George Wilson, under the management of Henry J. Sayers.

Primrose and West had a hit, and they came to be called "The Millionaires of Minstrelsy". He became the sole producer of the supposedly Richest and Costliest Minstrel Organization in Existence: West's Big Minstrel Jubilee, which featured some of the leading performers of the day, always ending with the cast, in blackface, singing songs of the period.

He died on February 15, 1902, in Chicago, Illinois, of cancer. He was buried at Green-Wood Cemetery in Brooklyn, New York. On his grave marker are the words "None Knew Him But To Love Him. None named him save in praise."

References

1853 births
1902 deaths
Burials at Green-Wood Cemetery
Blackface minstrel managers and producers
Blackface minstrel performers
Blackface minstrel troupes
19th-century American singers
19th-century American businesspeople